The Office of the Attorney General of Angola (Procuradoria-Geral da República) primarily represents the state—particularly with criminal prosecutions. Additionally, the Attorney General of Angola defends the legality of judicial functions, monitor for procedural compliance in the court system, and defend the legal rights of individuals and corporations. By the Constitution of Angola, the office is given administrative and financial autonomy.

Composition 
The office is composed of three departments: Public Prosecutor's Office (which is composed of the public prosecutors who represent the state), Supreme Judicial Council of the Public Prosecutor's Office (which manages and regulates the public prosecutors), and the Military Prosecutor's Office (which primarily oversees the legality of the natural security bodies—e.g., Angolan Armed Forces, National Police Force, etc.). The position of the Attorney General is appointed for a five-year term that might be renewed by the President of the Republic of Angola upon the recommendation of the Supreme Judicial Council.

List of attorneys general 

 Antero de Abreu (1977–1993) [1st Attorney General] 
 Domingos Culolo (1993–2002) 
 Augusto da Costa Carneiro (2002–2007)
 João Maria de Sousa (2007–2017) 
 Hélder Fernando Pitta Grós (2017–present)

See also 

 Attorney general
 Justice minister
 Ministry of Justice (Angola)

References 

Attorneys General of Angola